Sturno is a town and comune in the province of Avellino, in the Campania region of southern Italy.
 
The town, located in the valley of the Ufita river, is bordered by Carife, Castel Baronia, Flumeri, Frigento and Rocca San Felice.

History
Sturno became an independent township in 1809. Prior to that, Sturno was called Casali di Frigento and was a hamlet of the town of Frigento. As a farming community, it struggled economically in the late 19th and early 20th centuries.

Economy
The surrounding area is farmland under intense cultivation. The local farms are also known for breeding sheep and goats.

Twin towns 
 Glen Cove, New York, USA

See also
Irpinia

References

External links
Official website

Cities and towns in Campania